Grevillea psilantha is a species of flowering plant in the family Proteaceae and is endemic to a small area in the Kimberley region of Western Australia. It is an erect shrub with erect, linear to narrowly egg-shaped leaves, and cylindrical clusters of white to cream-coloured flowers.

Description
Both surface of the leaves are similar with several faint, parallel veins.

TaxonomyGrevillea psilantha was first formally described in 1986 by Donald McGillivray in his book New Names in Grevillea (Proteaceae) from specimens collected by Kevin Francis Kenneally, in the Bungle Bungle Range in 1984. The specific epithet (psilantha) means "smooth-flowered".

Distribution and habitat
This grevillea grows in crevices in the walls of sandstone gorges in the Bungle Bungle Range, in the eastern part of Kimberley region of Western Australia.

Conservation statusGrevillea psilantha'' is listed as "Priority Two" by the Western Australian Government Department of Biodiversity, Conservation and Attractions, meaning that it is poorly known and from only one or a few locations.

See also
 List of Grevillea species

References

psilantha
Proteales of Australia
Eudicots of Western Australia
Taxa named by Donald McGillivray
Plants described in 1986